Beauregard-Baret is a commune in the Drôme department in southeastern France.

Population

See also
Communes of the Drôme department

References

External links

 Official site

Communes of Drôme